The Sham Legion (Faylaq al-Shām) is an alliance of Sunni Islamist rebel groups formed in March 2014, during the Syrian Civil War. The alliance was formed from 19 different groups, some of which were previously affiliated with the Muslim Brotherhood of Syria and the Shields of the Revolution Council.

History

The Sham Legion was formed on 10 March 2014 from 19 Islamist rebel groups in Syria. These groups operated from the Aleppo Governorate to Damascus, but were concentrated in the Idlib, Hama, and Homs governorates. The formation aimed to "unify the ranks" of non-al-Qaeda-affiliated Islamist rebels in Syria. After its formation, the group took part in the Battle of Morek and Khan Shaykhun in 2014. Upon the formation of the group, it immediately distanced itself from the Syrian Muslim Brotherhood in order to win Saudi aid. The group also sent advisers to support Libya Dawn forces based in Tripoli, which were fighting against the Libyan National Army.

On 24 March 2015, the Army of Conquest, an alliance of Sunni Islamist and Salafist jihadist groups in Syria, was announced, with the Sham Legion as a member group. As part of the Army of Conquest, the Sham Legion took part in the Battle of Idlib and the subsequent Idlib and wider Northwestern Syria offensives. On 26 April 2015, along with six other major Aleppo-based rebel groups (Ahrar al-Sham, Jaysh al-Islam, Fastaqim Union, Levant Front, Levant Revolutionaries Battalions, and Dawn of Caliphate Battalions), the Sham Legion established the Fatah Halab joint operations room. Major Yasser Abdul Rahim, field commander of the Sham Legion, was appointed commander of Fatah Halab, a position he maintained until government forces recaptured all of Aleppo in December 2016.

Between 2014 and 2016, the Sham Legion was at one point a rebel group vetted by the United States and received BGM-71 TOW anti-tank missiles from it. In January 2016, the Northern Brigade was formed as part of the Sham Legion in the Aleppo Governorate. The group participated in Operation Euphrates Shield, which began on 24 August 2016 in Jarabulus and aimed to expel the Syrian Democratic Forces and the Islamic State from the northern Aleppo Governorate. Following the campaign, the Sham Legion became involved in inter-rebel conflict between the different Turkish-backed Free Syrian Army (TFSA) factions. On 30 May 2017, after increasing inter-rebel conflict in northern Aleppo, the Sham Legion expelled the Northern Brigade from its ranks and dismissed its commander, Captain Mustafa Rami al-Kuja. The Sham Legion, along with six other TFSA groups, formed the Victory Bloc in June 2017, while the Free North Brigade, formerly part of the al-Tawhid Brigade, joined the Sham Legion on 16 June 2017.

The Sham Legion also took part in the Turkish military intervention in Afrin in 2018, with its chief commander Major Yasser Abdul Rahim serving as a "key member" of the campaign's Olive Branch Operations' Room. Rahim stated that the operation against the Syrian Democratic Forces in the Afrin District intended to "liberate the area from all kinds of terrorism and protect civilians, Arabs and Kurds" and that the TFSA would attempt to avoid civilian casualties. On 7 February 2018, Rahim was dismissed from his position as commander without explanation, and was replaced by Khaldun Mador ("Abu Jamil"). Khaldun, reportedly the third highest-ranking commander of the Sham Legion. Rahim went on to join the Glory Corps. In May 2018, along with 10 other rebel groups in northwestern Syria, the Sham Legion formed the National Front for Liberation, which was officially announced on 28 May. Colonel Fadlallah al-Haji, commander of the Sham Legion, was appointed as the overall commander of the formation. On 4 June, the Martyrs of Islam Brigade, also part of the NFL, joined the Sham Legion.

On 26 October 2020, Russian warplanes targeted a training camp of the Sham Legion, near Kafr Takharim in Idlib Governorate. The strike killed at least 78 fighters and wounded over 100 more. The director of the Syrian Observatory for Human Rights, Rami Abdel Rahman, called the strike the heaviest attack since the beginning of the ceasefire in March 2020. A rebel spokesman gave estimates of more than 170 fighters dead or were wounded.

Member groups
Fatiheen Brigade
Eman Brigade
Sihem al-Haq Brigade
Central Division
Ajnad al-Sham Islamic Union Idlib branch
Sadiq Brigade
10th Coastal Brigade
111th Regiment (until 2019)
Free North Brigade
Sham Commandos Brigade
Sons of Waer Battalion 
Revolutionaries of Waer Battalion
Martyrs of Islam Brigade
Martyrs of Daraya Battalion
Martyrs of the Revolution Battalion
Fayha al-Sham Battalion
Lions of Tawhid Battalion
Descendants of Saladin Battalion
Lions of Sunna Battalion
Special Task Force Battalion
Artillery Company
Engineering and Air Defence Company
20th Division
The Qaqaa Gathering

See also
 List of armed groups in the Syrian Civil War

References

External links
   
 Sham Legion's Youtube channel

Anti-government factions of the Syrian civil war
Military units and formations established in 2014
Anti-ISIL factions in Syria
Turkish supported militant groups of the Syrian civil war